The Best of Dean Martin is a 1966 compilation album of Dean Martin songs, released by Capitol Records.

Track listing
The following are the tracks on the album:
 "That's Amore" (Harry Warren, Jack Brooks) - 3:07
 "You're Nobody till Somebody Loves You" (Russ Morgan, Larry Stock, James Cavanaugh) - 2:13
 "Volare" (Domenico Modugno, Franco Migliacci, Mitchell Parish) - 3:00
 "It's Easy to Remember (And So Hard to Forget)" (Richard Rodgers, Lorenz Hart) - 3:16
 "Sway" (Pablo Beltrán Ruiz, Norman Gimbel) - 2:43
 "Return to Me" (Carmen Lombardo, Danny Di Minno) - 2:25
 "Memories Are Made of This" (Terry Gilkyson, Richard Dehr, Frank Miller) - 2:17
 "June in January" (Ralph Rainger, Leo Robin) - 2:49
 "Come Back to Sorrento (Torna a Surriento)" (Ernesto De Curtis, Claude Aveling) - 3:14
 "Just in Time" (Jule Styne, Betty Comden, Adolph Green) - 2:14
 "I'm Yours"  (Johnny Green, E. Y. Harburg) - 3:16
 "Hey, Brother, Pour the Wine" (Ross Bagdasarian, Sr.) - 2:53

References in other media
A movie, Return to Me, was named after the song.

References

Dean Martin albums
1966 greatest hits albums
Capitol Records compilation albums